The Mongolia national cricket team is the team that represents Mongolia in international men's cricket. In July 2021, the International Cricket Council (ICC) inducted the team as an Associate Member, becoming the 22nd member in the Asia region.

References

External links
 Cricket Mongolia

Cricket
Cricket in Mongolia
National cricket teams